The 2018 World Judo Championships was held between 20 and 27 September 2018 at National Gymnastics Arena in Baku, Azerbaijan.

Schedule	
All times are local (UTC+4).

Medal summary

Medal table

Men's events

Women's events

Mixed events

Prize money
The sums written are per medalist, bringing the total prizes awarded to 798,000€ for the individual events and 200,000€ for the team event.

References

External links
 
 Official website

 
World Judo Championships
World Championships
World Championships
Judo
Judo
World Championships 2018
Judo
Judo